Glyoxalase domain-containing protein 4 is an enzyme that in humans is encoded by the GLOD4 gene.

References

Further reading